Ellen J. Levy is an American writer and academic who is an associate professor of English at Colorado State University. Her collection of short stories, Love, In Theory, was published in 2012, and her first novel, The Cape Doctor, in 2021.

Early life and education 
Levy was born in St. Louis Park, Minnesota. She earned a Bachelor of Arts degree from Yale University and a Master of Fine Arts from Ohio State University.

Career
, she is an associate professor in the English department at Colorado State University, concentrating on fiction and non-fiction creative writing. She received tenure in 2014.

Her work has appeared in The Paris Review, The New York Times, and Salon. She was the editor of the anthology, Tasting Life Twice: Literary Lesbian Fiction by New American Writers, which won a Lambda Literary Award.

Levy's debut story collection, Love, In Theory, won the 2012 Flannery O'Connor Award for Short Fiction, a 2012 Foreword Book of the Year Award (Bronze), and the 2014 Great Lake Colleges Association's New Writers Award for Fiction. It was released in French by Editions Rivages in 2015. A Publishers Weekly review of the book called Levy "a master of his [sic] form".

The Cape Doctor
In February 2019, publisher Little, Brown and Company acquired Levy's historical novel The Cape Doctor. It is a portrayal of military surgeon James Barry (1789-1865), who was born Margaret Bulkley but lived as a man as an adult. When Levy announced the upcoming book's sale on social media, she referred to Barry as "she" and a "heroine", which was criticized by transgender people and some authors who say male pronouns are more in line with Barry's life history and self-image. Levy told The Times that Barry is most often referred to as "I" in her novel and sometimes as "she" and "he". In response to the controversy, biographer Jeremy Dronfield said, "I have no argument with seeing James Barry as a transgender icon, or Margaret as a feminist role model. I do take issue with those who insist on recognising one and erasing the other."

The book was released in June, 2021. The New York Times reviewer said that the book, following the female protagonist Perry, explores her experiences "sometimes painfully, sometimes wittily, always persuasively". Kirkus Reviews wrote, "Artfully written but more likely to attract attention for its subject than its author's craft."

Personal life
Levy identifies as a lesbian. In a 2013 essay, she described herself as marrying a man but continuing to be a lesbian.

Publications

Books

 Tasting Life Twice: Literary Lesbian Fiction by New American Writers. Avon. 1995. .
 Love, In Theory. University of Georgia Press. 2012. .
 Amazons: A Love Story. University of Missouri Press. 2012. .
 The Cape Doctor. Little, Brown and Company. 2021. .

References

External links 
 
 Faculty page at Colorado State University

Yale University alumni
Colorado State University faculty
American women short story writers
American lesbian writers
Living people
Year of birth missing (living people)
American women academics
21st-century American LGBT people
21st-century American women writers